Gubkin is a town in Belgorod Oblast, Russia, located  northeast of Belgorod on the Oskolets River, a tributary of the Oskol River. Population:

History
It was founded in the 1930s in place of the village of Korobkovo and named after geologist Ivan Gubkin. In 1939, it was granted urban-type settlement status. Town status was granted to it on December 23, 1955. It was elevated in status to that of a town of oblast significance on March 7, 1960.

Administrative and municipal status
Within the framework of administrative divisions, Gubkin serves as the administrative center of Gubkinsky District, even though it is not a part of it. As an administrative division, it is incorporated separately as the town of oblast significance of Gubkin—an administrative unit with the status equal to that of the districts. As a municipal division, the territories of the town of oblast significance of Gubkin and of Gubkinsky District are incorporated as Gubkinsky Urban Okrug.

References

Notes

Sources

External links

Official website of Gubkin 
Unofficial website of Gubkin 
Gubkin Business Directory  

Cities and towns in Belgorod Oblast
Cities and towns built in the Soviet Union
Populated places established in the 1930s